Hans Backman (born 1963) is a Swedish Liberal People's Party politician, who was a member of the Riksdag from 2002 to 2014.

References

Members of the Riksdag from the Liberals (Sweden)
Living people
1963 births
Members of the Riksdag 2002–2006
Members of the Riksdag 2006–2010
Members of the Riksdag 2010–2014
21st-century Swedish politicians